The Palais de Justice of Strasbourg is a large 19th-century neo-Greek building (with neo-Egyptian elements) in the Tribunal quarter of the Neustadt district of Strasbourg, France, which houses Strasbourg's main court, the Tribunal de Grande Instance.

History 
The Palais de Justice was built between 1894 and 1898 by the Danish architect  Skjold Neckelmann, after the death of his partner August Hartel. It was to be his last major work.
 It stands next to the Catholic church Église Saint-Pierre-le-Jeune catholique, which had been designed by Hartel and Neckelmann in the Romanesque Revival style.

The Palais, designed in Greek Revival style, features a large portico with Ionic columns, surmounted by a triangular pediment that is decorated with the allegories of Justice (under the figure of the goddess Athena) and Fortitude or Courage, with two sphinxes. The entrance gate features a mask of Gorgon, believed to ward off evil.

Renovation
In the 21st century, there was a long debate as to whether to build a new courthouse or to renovate the existing building. The latter option was finally chosen, with work due to begin at the end of 2013.

The work, which will entend the existing building, has been assigned to the Spanish architect Jordi Garcés, and is expected to be completed in 2016, at a cost of 63.2 million euros.

However, the renovation plans of Garcés are being contested in the courts by the Association des Vieux amis de Strasbourg, on the grounds that they involve the destruction of three courtrooms that are designated as monuments historiques.

Historical monument
On 2 July 1992, the facades, the inner courtyard (Salle des pas perdus) and the courtrooms were classified as a monument historique.

References 

Historicist architecture in France
Greek Revival architecture
Courthouses in France
Government buildings completed in 1898
Monuments historiques of Strasbourg